Stockton, California, held an election for mayor on March 3, 2020 with a runoff election held on November 3, 2020. Despite a strong performance in the primary, incumbent Democrat Michael Tubbs was defeated by Republican Kevin Lincoln in the general election.

Municipal elections in California are officially nonpartisan; candidates' party affiliations do not appear on the ballot.

Candidates

Declared
 Shelly Hollis, business owner and filmmaker.
 Andrew Lee Johnson, business owner.
 Kevin Lincoln, candidate for State Assembly in 2016. (Party preference: Republican)
 Shoua Lo, environmentalist and chemical engineer.
 Motec Patrick Sanchez, community advocate and USMC veteran.
 Bill Smith, project manager.
 Michael Tubbs, incumbent mayor and former city council member. (Party preference: Democratic)
 Ralph Lee White, former city council member and candidate for mayor in 2012.

Results

First round

Runoff

References

Stockton
Stockton
Mayoral elections in Stockton, California